Outlaw Empires (also known as Kurt Sutter's Outlaw Empires) is a six-part documentary series about American outlaws. It was first aired on May 14, 2012, on Discovery Channel. Each episode focuses on one organization and includes dramatizations of real events and interviews with current and former members. In the biker episode, only former members are interviewed as patched members needed to get the approval of all other members from all other charters to appear on the show.

Episodes

References

External links

2010s American documentary television series
2012 American television series debuts
2012 American television series endings
English-language television shows
Discovery Channel original programming
Television series about organized crime
Works about organized crime in the United States